The National Air Force of Angola or FANA is the air branch of the Armed Forces of Angola.

With an inventory of more than 300 aircraft, FANA is (on paper) one of the largest and strongest air forces of Africa.

History
Angola became independent from Portugal on 11 November 1975. However, the foundations for the establishment of the air force were laid before independence when members of the then Flying Club of Angola were assembled at Luanda in October 1975. These people and aircraft left behind by the Portuguese Air Force formed the basis for the air transport branch of the force.

The force was formally established on 21 January 1976 as the People's Air Force of Angola / Air and Antiaircraft Defense or FAPA/DAA. Its first batch of Soviet MiG fighter aircraft was delivered in mid-December 1975. The FAPA/DAA fought several battles with South African Air Force aircraft in November 1981, October 1982, and twice in September 1987.

Circa 1983–85, in order to enhance MPLA's combat capacity, Romania sent 150 flight instructors and other aviation personnel, who contributed to the establishment of an Angolan Military Aviation School.

The FANA has bases at Luanda, Catumbela, Belas, Luena, Kuito, Lubango and Moçâmedes. The World Factbook, produced by the CIA, reported that by 2007 the name of the force had changed to "National Air Force".

Most of the inventory is out of service, and refers to historical equipment delivered along the years. FAN has many bases – most of them, former Portuguese Air Force bases and other courtesy of the Cold War – but few airplanes that actually fly. The main body of the active air force is made of transport/cargo planes, used for moving supplies, equipment and personnel between parts of the country.

Structure 
The National Air Force of Angola is headed by the Chief of Staff of the FANA. The Chief of Staff of the FANA is a General directly subordinate to the Chief of the General Staff of the Armed Forces of Angola.

FANA follows a Russian/ex-Soviet organizational model, with its air units being aviation regiments, each one including several squadrons. To each of the six aviation regiments corresponds an air base. Besides the aviation regiments, there is also a Pilot Training School.

Its order of battle is:
 25th Fighter Aviation Regiment (Kuito Airport)
 13th Fighter Squadron (Su-27 and Su-27UB)
 12th Fighter Squadron (MiG-23ML and MiG-23UB)
 11th Fighter Squadron (MiG-21bis, MiG-21M, MiG- 21F-13 and MiG-21U)
 26th Fighter Aviation Regiment (Moçâmedes Air Base)
 14th Fighter Squadron (Su-24MK)
 16th Fighter Squadron (Su-25K and Su-25UBK)
 15th Fighter Squadron (Su-22M-4K and Su-22UM-3K)
 24th Training Regiment (Menongue Airport)
 8th Training Squadron (L-39ZA, EMB-312, PC-9 and PC-7)
 9th Training Squadron (L-29 Delfin, MiG-15UTI, Yak-11 and PC-6B)
 10th Training Squadron (Cessna 172 and Z-142C)
 23rd Air Transportation Regiment (Luanda Air Base)
 5th Light Transportation Squadron (An-2, An-12, An-24, An-26, An-28, An-32, An-72, An-74, F-27, C-212-300, C-212-200, BN- 2A-21 Commander Turbo, Do-27, Do-28C and Do-228)
6th Transportation Squadron (Il-76T, C-130K, Lockheed L-100-20 and Boeing 707)
7th Transportation Squadron (Boeing 707 and EMB-120)

 21st Transportation Helicopter Regiment (Luena Airport)
1st Helicopter Squadron (SA-315, IAR-316, SA-342m, AB-212 and SA-365m)
2nd Helicopter Squadron (Mi-8, Mi-17 and AS-532)
 22nd Combat Helicopter Regiment (Huambo Air Base)
 3rd Helicopter Squadron (Mi-25, Mi-35, AS-565AA, AS-565UA and SA-342m)
 4th Helicopter Squadron (Mi-24, Mi-25 and Mi-35)
 Pilot Basic Training School (Lobito)

Inventory

Aircraft

Air Defense

Armaments

Accidents and incidents
On 14 September 2011, an Embraer EMB 120 Brasilia, operated by the Air Force, crashed just after takeoff from Nova Lisboa Airport, killing 11 army officers (including three generals, among them Kalias Pedro) and six civilians. The accident occurred at 11:30 am at the airport, with a military delegation on board the flight at Albano Machado Airport.

References

Further reading

Military of Angola
Angola
Aviation in Angola
Military units and formations established in 1976
Angola